The 2011 World Snowshoe Championships was the 4th edition of the global snowshoe running competition, World Snowshoe Championships, organised by the World Snowshoe Federation and took place in Myoko on 12 and 13 February 2011.

Results
Two titles were assigned, on 400 m and 15 km.

Men's 400 m

Women's 400 m

Men's overall

Women's overall

References

External links
 World Snowshoe Federation official web site

World Snowshoe Championships